In percussion, cymbal choke is a drum stroke or push which consists of striking a cymbal with a drum stick held in one hand and then immediately grabbing the cymbal with another hand, or more rarely, with the same hand. The cymbal choke produces a burst of sound which is abruptly silenced, which can be used for punctuation or dramatic fortissimo effects. In some modern music, namely heavy metal, it is "often employed to emphasize a particular beat or signal an abrupt conclusion to a passage." Cymbal chokes are used extensively by classical percussionists to muffle the sound of a cymbal in accordance with the composer's notation, or in an attempt to match the sustain of other instruments in the ensemble. "The effect, a sudden burst of sound, is [often] further strengthened by a single, simultaneous kick with the bass drum."

Choke cymbal was common in the early jazz drumset (1900-1930). "In early jazz...A drummer would accent key moments in the music by striking the cymbal for a dramatic crash, then choking it with his [or her] hand. The abrupt sound made an exclamation point." The hi-hat eighth notes only stop in "Good Times Bad Times" (1969), "during measures where a cymbal choke occurs (and the band rests)."

In modern music, cymbal chokes were used extensively by drummer Roger Taylor and can be heard in many Queen songs including "The Loser in the End" (1974) and "The Prophet's Song" (1975). It can also be heard at the start "Eye of the Tiger" by Survivor and of the Metallica song "Master of Puppets". It can also be heard throughout most of "The Happiest Days of Our Lives" by Pink Floyd.

See also
Damping (music)
Ghost note

References

Heavy metal performance techniques
Percussion performance techniques
Cymbals
Drum strokes